Akritogyra is a genus of sea snails, marine gastropod mollusks, unassigned in the superfamily Seguenzioidea.

Species
Species within the genus Akritogyra include:
 Akritogyra conspicua (Monterosato, 1880)
 Akritogyra curvilineata Warén, 1992
 Akritogyra helicella Warén, 1993
 Akritogyra similis (Jeffreys, 1883)

References

 Gofas, S.; Le Renard, J.; Bouchet, P. (2001). Mollusca, in: Costello, M.J. et al. (Ed.) (2001). European register of marine species: a check-list of the marine species in Europe and a bibliography of guides to their identification. Collection Patrimoines Naturels, 50: pp. 180–213
 Kano Y., Chikyu, E. & Warén, A. (2009) Morphological, ecological and molecular characterization of the enigmatic planispiral snail genus Adeuomphalus (Vetigastropoda: Seguenzioidea). Journal of Molluscan Studies, 75:397-418.

 
Gastropod genera